Richard Joseph Furey (March 8, 1925 – June 8, 1998) was an American professional basketball player. He played in the National Basketball League for the Anderson Duffey Packers (23 games), Flint Dow A.C.'s (one game), and Tri-Cities Blackhawks (one game). For his career he averaged 2.4 points per game. Furey then coached football, basketball, and baseball at Forest Lake Area High School in Forest Lake, Minnesota.

References

1925 births
1998 deaths
American men's basketball coaches
American men's basketball players
Anderson Packers players
Basketball coaches from Minnesota
Basketball players from Saint Paul, Minnesota
Flint Dow A.C.'s players
Forwards (basketball)
Guards (basketball)
High school baseball coaches in the United States
High school basketball coaches in Minnesota
High school football coaches in Minnesota
St. Thomas (Minnesota) Tommies men's basketball players
Tri-Cities Blackhawks players